Pelekium is a genus of mosses belonging to the family Thuidiaceae.

The genus has cosmopolitan distribution.

Species
As accepted by GBIF;

References

Hypnales
Moss genera